Gymnastics events have been staged at the Olympic Games since 1896, with women competing for the time at the 1928 Olympic Games.  At the 2020 Olympic Games Yeo Seo-jeong became the first South Korean female artistic gymnast to win a medal.

Gymnasts

Medalists

See also 
 South Korea women's national artistic gymnastics team

References

Korea South
gymnasts
Olympic